The 1995 Churchill Insurance World Indoor Bowls Championship  was held at Preston Guild Hall, Preston, England, from 14–27 February 1995.
Andy Thomson won his second consecutive title beating Richard Corsie in the final.

Richard Corsie & Alex Marshall won the Pairs title.

The Women's World Championship took place in Cumbernauld from April 5–7. The event was sponsored by Churchill Insurance and was won by Joyce Lindores.

Winners

Draw and results

Men's singles

+ Margaret Johnston, Jan Woodley & Jackie Smyth were invited to play in the Men's Singles event.

Men's Pairs

Women's singles

References

External links 
Official website

World Indoor Bowls Championship